Johannes Ingvard Ludvigsen (12 April 1904 – 5 December 1965) was a Danish boxer who competed in the 1928 Summer Olympics.

He was born and died in Copenhagen.

In 1928 he was eliminated in the second of the middleweight class after losing his fight to the upcoming gold medalist Piero Toscani.

External links
sports-reference.com

1904 births
1965 deaths
Middleweight boxers
Olympic boxers of Denmark
Boxers at the 1928 Summer Olympics
Danish male boxers
Sportspeople from Copenhagen